Foday Musa Suso (born 9 December 1953, in Sarre Hamadi, Wuli District, in the Upper River Division of The Gambia) is a Gambian musician and composer.  He is a member of the Mandinka ethnic group, and is a griot.  Griots are the oral historians and musicians of the Mandingo people who live in several west African nations.  Griots are a living library for the community providing history, entertainment, and wisdom while playing and singing their songs.  It is an extensive verbal and musical heritage that can only be passed down within a griot family.

Suso is a direct descendant of Jali Madi Wlen Suso, the griot who invented the kora over four centuries ago.  He spent his childhood in a traditional Gambian village, in a household filled with kora music.  Though his father was a master kora player, in griot tradition a father does not teach his own children the instrument.  When Foday was nine, his father sent him to live with master kora teacher Sekou Suso in the village of Pasamasi, Wuli District.  He trained with Sekou Suso until the age of 18.  Suso's primary instrument is the kora, but he also plays the gravikord and several other instruments.

Suso emigrated to Chicago, Illinois, United States in 1977, being one of the first jali's to relocate to North America.  Once in Chicago, he formed the Mandingo Griot Society with local percussionists Hamid Drake and Adam Rudolph, which played fusion music around the world.  He has performed with Bill Laswell, Philip Glass, Pharoah Sanders, Jack DeJohnette, Ginger Baker, Paul Simon, Yousif Sheronick, and the Kronos Quartet (Pieces of Africa).  He has contributed to music for the Olympic Games in 1984 and 2004.

His electrified kora can also be heard on several tracks on Herbie Hancock's 1984 electro-funk album Sound-System. The following year, Suso and Hancock came out with another album, Village Life, that consists entirely of duets between them, Hancock on synthesizer and Suso on kora, talking drums, and vocals.

Discography 
 1970 - Kora Music from Gambia (Folkways)
 1979 - Mandingo Griot Society: Mandingo Griot Society (Flying Fish)
 1982 - Mandingo Griot Society: Mighty Rhythm (Flying Fish)
 1984 - Hand Power (Flying Fish)
 1984 - Mandingo Featuring Foday Musa Suso: Watto Sitta (Celluloid), produced by Bill Laswell
 1984 - Herbie Hancock: Sound-System (Columbia), guest appearances
 1985 - with Herbie Hancock: Village Life (Columbia)
 1986 - Mansa Bendung (Flying Fish)
 1988 - The Dreamtime (CMP), solo recording produced by Bill Laswell
 1985 - with Herbie Hancock: Jazz Africa (Verve)
 1992 - with Philip Glass: Music from "The Screens" (POINT Music)
 1995 - with Possession & African Dub: Off World One (Sub Meta), produced by Bill Laswell, FMS plays balaphone
 1996 - with Pharoah Sanders: Message from Home (Verve), guest appearance
 2005 - with Jack DeJohnette: Music from the Hearts of the Masters (Golden Beams)
 2005 - with Jack DeJohnette's The Ripple Effect: Hybrids (Golden Beams)
 2008 - The Two Worlds (Orange Mountain Music)
 2012 - with Gretchen Rowe: Koralations: Heart to Heart (African Kora meets American Poetry)

Sources
Jali Kunda: Griots of West Africa & Beyond (1996).  Book and CD set.  Ellipsis Arts

References

External links
Foday Musa Suso official site
Foday Musa Suso page from Other Minds site
Kora Music from Gambia Album Details at Smithsonian Folkways

1953 births
Living people
Jazz fusion musicians
Gambian singers
Gambian emigrants to the United States
American people of Mandinka descent
Gambian Kora players
Griots
People from Upper River Division